Nekipelovo is a rural locality (a village) in Gorodetskoye Rural Settlement, Kichmengsko-Gorodetsky District, Vologda Oblast, Russia. The population was 29 as of 2002.

Geography 
Nekipelovo is located 21 km northwest of Kichmengsky Gorodok (the district's administrative centre) by road. Vaganovo is the nearest rural locality.

References 

Rural localities in Kichmengsko-Gorodetsky District